Beverly Hills is a southern suburb of Sydney, in the state of New South Wales, Australia. Beverly Hills is located 15 kilometres southwest of the Sydney central business district and is part of the St George area and is split between the local government areas of the Georges River Council and the City of Canterbury-Bankstown. The postcode is 2209, which it shares with neighbouring Narwee.

Beverly Hills is mostly residential, consisting of many freestanding red brick and tile bungalows built in the years immediately after World War II. Many of these feature late Art Deco design elements. Medium density flats have been built in the areas close to King Georges Road and Stoney Creek Road.

History

Beverly Hills was originally known as Dumbleton after a local farm in the area, circa 1830. This name was generally disliked by residents who lobbied to supplant it with a more glamorous alternative to coincide with the arrival of the East Hills railway line, which opened 31 December 1931. The name was changed to Beverly Hills, at a time when Beverly Hills in California was becoming known for being the home of many famous movie stars. Real estate developments followed in the 1930s and 1940s. The post office opened 1 October 1940.

Heritage listings 
Beverly Hills has a number of heritage-listed sites, including:

 East Hills railway: Beverly Hills railway station
 Devonia Farm house
 Federation House
 Hilcrest
 Woodville

Commercial area

The main shopping strip is located on King Georges Road, near the Beverly Hills railway station. There are over 40 different cafes, restaurants and takeaways along King Georges Road featuring Asian, Mediterranean, and Modern Australian cuisines.

The area has all the features typical of Australian metropolitan localities: restaurants, retail shops, an IGA supermarket, real estate agents, a pub (the Beverly Hills Hotel), cinema, ATMs, kindergarten, primary/high schools, Scouts, parks, leisure and health facilities.

Transport
Beverly Hills railway station is on the Airport & South Line of the Sydney Trains network.

The main road running through Beverly Hills is King Georges Road, connecting it north to Wiley Park and south to Blakehurst. The road has palm trees running through its median strip as a nod to its Californian namesake. The other main road in Beverly Hills is Stoney Creek Road. This road intersects King Georges Road and connects Beverly Hills west to Peakhurst and onto Menai, and east to Rockdale, Brighton-Le-Sands, Mascot and Sydney Airport.

Entrances to the M5 Motorway are located on King Georges Road, north of the shopping centre. The M5 Motorway connects east to Bexley North, Arncliffe, Sydney Airport and the Sydney CBD and west to Liverpool and Campbelltown.
Buses run along King Georges Rd connecting travellers to commercial and shopping centres at Hurstville and Roselands.

Schools
Notable amongst the public buildings and amenities are Beverly Hills Girls' High School, Beverly Hills Primary School, Beverly Hills North Primary School and Regina Coeli Primary Schoo. Beverly Hills Girls' High School has approximately 1100 students and in September 2010 was named a Centre for Excellence by NSW DET.

Churches

Regina Coeli Roman Catholic Church is Australia's only Catholic war memorial church. It was built in the early 1960s to commemorate the Australian-US alliance during World War II. The flags of both nations are permanently hung on either side of the main altar, and a special Mass attended by US service personnel and diplomatic representatives is conducted there annually in commemoration of the Battle of the Coral Sea. Regina Coeli is sited prominently on the highest point in Beverly Hills, and is a landmark visible for many kilometres in all directions.

Other churches in the suburb include: St Matthews Anglican Church, St Bede's Anglican Church, Church@School, Beverly Hills Baptist Church, Beverly Hills Chinese Baptist Church, Beverly Hills Church of Christ, and Beverly Hills New Apostolic Church.

Parks and recreation
 Beverly Hills Park features two full-length football ovals and two barbecue areas.
 Vanessa Street Multi-sport Courts
 Canterbury Golf Course
 Coolabah Street Tennis courts

Demographics
According to the 2016 census of Population, there were 10,156 residents in Beverly Hills. 49.4% of people were born in Australia. The most common countries of birth were China 14.7%, Hong Kong 3.3%, Greece 2.4%, Vietnam 2.2% and New Zealand 1.8%. 37.3% of people only spoke English at home. Other languages spoken at home included Cantonese 14.3%, Mandarin 12.4%, Greek 8.2%, Arabic 5.6% and Vietnamese 2.3%. The next most common responses for religious affiliation were No Religion 24.3%, Catholic 23.2% and Eastern Orthodox 12.3%.

Notable residents
 Colin Dunmore Fuller (1882–1953) – farmer and soldier
 John Hewson - former politician
 Victor Huang (born 1999) – professional gamer, first Australian to play in the LCS
 Clara Iemma - cricketer
 Georgina McCready (1888–1980) – nurse, trade unionist and administrator
 Arthur Morris - cricketer

References

Suburbs of Sydney
Georges River Council
City of Canterbury-Bankstown
Australian places named after U.S. places or U.S. history